Matthew Stuart Dominick (born December 7, 1981; CDR, USN) is a  US Navy test pilot and NASA astronaut.  He has more than 1,600 hours of flight time in 28 aircraft, 400 carrier-arrested landings, 61 combat missions, and almost 200 flight test carrier landings.

Early life and education
Matthew Stuart Dominick was born on December 7, 1981, in Wheat Ridge, Colorado to Donald and Rhonda Dominick. He graduated from D'Evelyn Junior/Senior High School in Littleton, Colorado. In 2005, he received a Bachelor of Science in electrical engineering at the University of San Diego with minors in physics and mathematics, and was a member of the Navy ROTC and Sigma Phi Epsilon fraternity.

Military career
Following his graduation from the University of San Diego, Dominick was commissioned as an Ensign in the United States Navy.  He attended Primary Flight Training at NAS Pensacola and was designated a Naval Aviator in 2007. He completed F/A-18 Super Hornet training with VFA-106 at NAS Oceana, before being assigned to VFA-143. With VFA-143, Dominick completed two deployments in support of Operation Enduring Freedom before being selected to attend the United States Naval Test Pilot School (USNTPS) / Naval Postgraduate School co-operative program, allowing him to earn a Master of Science in Systems Engineering from the Naval Postgraduate School and attend the U.S. Naval Test Pilot School.

Following graduation from USNTPS, Dominick was designated a test pilot and was assigned to VX-23, based out of NAS Patuxent River, Maryland. There, he served as a developmental flight test project officer on numerous programs, including MAGIC CARPET, Joint Precision Approach & Landing Systems and Infrared Search and Track Pod. Dominick also contributed to the development of the X-47B, V-22 Osprey, E-2C Hawkeye, and F-35C Lightning II. At the time of his selection as an Astronaut, Dominick was serving as Department Head with VFA-115, based out of Atsugi, Japan.

His promotion to Navy Commander was approved on June 27, 2019, and made effective September 1, 2020.

NASA career
In June 2017, Dominick was selected as a member of NASA Astronaut Group 22, and began his two-year training.

Personal life
Dominick and his wife, Faith, have two daughters.  His parents still live in Wheat Ridge, Colorado.

Awards and honors
Dominick was the 2015 Naval Test Wing Atlantic Test Pilot of the Year and a Member of the 2015 Department of the Navy Test Team of the Year.  He has received three Strike/Flight Air Medals, Navy and Marine Corps Commendation Medal, and three Navy and Marine Corps Achievement Medals. He is a member of the Society of Experimental Test Pilots, Society of Flight Test Engineers, and the Tailhook Association.

References

1981 births
Living people
People from Wheat Ridge, Colorado
University of San Diego alumni
Military personnel from Colorado
United States Navy officers
United States Naval Aviators
Naval Postgraduate School alumni
United States Naval Test Pilot School alumni
American test pilots
United States Navy astronauts